Ahmed Pura Colony is a locality in Nizamabad, in the Indian state of Telangana. It is located at 500 meters from the commercial center Gandhi Chowk. All the residents of this locality are Muslims.

The area is heavily clustered with houses and commercial shops. Ahmed Pura is known for its cloth emporiums and bangle stores.

The nearby localities are Mustaid Pura and Barkat Pura.

See also
Vijay Rural Engineering College (VREC)
Nizamabad Railway Station
Nizamabad Bus Station

References 

Nizamabad, Telangana
Former colonies in Asia